Mia Colucci may refer to:

 Mia Colucci, a character in the 2002–2003 telenovela Rebelde Way, portrayed by Luisana Lopilato
 Mia Colucci, a character in the 2004–2006 telenovela Rebelde, portrayed by Anahí